The Paramount also known as the Best Western Paramount, is a hotel located in the Hamlet of Parksville, New York; Right outside of Liberty, New York. Today it is abandoned and has been so since 2000, The hotel is over 100 years old and is still standing. However it has been extremely vandalized since its abandonment in 2000. The Paramount survived the demise of the Borscht Belt but it was abandoned was a result of a fire in October 2000, the fire destroyed the lobby, the two story office, the conference space, the kitchen and nightclub.

History Before The Fire

Early History 
The Paramount actually started off as a boarding house in the early 1900s when the first owner moved to Parksville because of tuberculosis. He was the owner until he died then passed it down to his son, who passed it down to his son, Fred Gasthalter. As time went on, more buildings were added to the property.

Mid 1900s 
In the 1960s the hotel was frequented by hunters who wanted a clean place to stay that offered fast and early breakfast.

Late 1900s 
The hotel joined the Best Western franchise and was now known as Best Western Paramount, still under the ownership of Fred Gasthalter. According to Fred, joining Best Western was "The greatest thing yet".

The Fire 
On October 16, 2000 around 3 AM the front desk received a call saying there was smoke in the kitchen, she then called 911 because of the report of smoke. Over 100 firefighters from 6 different companies responded to the fire, saving it from total destruction but failing to save the lobby, nightclub, kitchen and offices.

The day before the fire the hotel was running a Jewish educational program, some of them were still staying at the hotel for a bit longer.

It was a described as a "Nightmare". Over 300 guests (some disabled and many seniors) had to be evacuated.

Modern Day

Buying The Paramount 
In 2004 somebody bought The Paramount for $4,000,000 after the original owner filed for bankruptcy. Today, the hotel is for sale for about $5,000,000.

The Condition Today 
Today the hotel still stands but it is extremely vandalized, most if not all windows are smashed and some walls are destroyed (Specifically the walls in the pool room). The indoor pool is filled with trash and even hydrochloric acid that was poured in by a random vandal.

References  

Defunct hotels in New York (state)
Catskills
Borscht Belt
Sullivan County, New York